The 2018 AFLX competition was the inaugural Australian Football League (AFL) pre-season series of matches, played under the laws of AFLX, a variation of Australian rules football. The matches were played from 15–17 February 2018.

Fixtures
The AFL released the fixture and format for the three groups on 24 January 2018. Each of the groups were split into two pools of three teams, with the top team from each pool playing off in a grand final.

Group A (Adelaide)

Pool A

Pool B

Grand final

Group B (Melbourne)

Pool A

Pool B

Grand final

Group C (Sydney)

Pool A

Pool B

Grand final

References

External links
 Official website

2018
AFLX competition
2018 in Australian rules football